Gare d'Orsay is a former Paris railway station and hotel, built in 1900 to designs by Victor Laloux, Lucien Magne and Émile Bénard; it served as a terminus for the Chemin de Fer de Paris à Orléans (Paris–Orléans Railway). It was the first electrified urban terminal station in the world, opened 28 May 1900, in time for the 1900 Exposition Universelle. After closure as a station, it reopened in December 1986 as the Musée d'Orsay, an art museum. The museum is currently served by the RER station of the same name.

History

It was begun in 1810 but not completed until 1840, when its ground floor was occupied by the Council. In 1842 the Cour des Comptes was housed in the first floor. After the fall of the French Second Empire in 1870, the Paris Commune briefly took power from March through May 1871. The archives, library and works of art were removed to Palace of Versailles and eventually both the Conseil and the Cour des Comptes were rehoused in the Palais-Royal.

The largely empty Palais d'Orsay was burned by the soldiers of the Paris Commune, along with the Tuileries Palace and several other public buildings associated with Napoleon III, on the night of 23–24 May 1871, an event which was described by Émile Zola.

The site was purchased by the Compagnie Paris-Orléans, which erected the monumental terminus station for its railways to southwestern France. The station had electrified tracks, modelled on the Baltimore Belt Line electrified railway which had been completed in 1895. The station was constructed in Beaux-Arts style and the western and southern sides of the building included the 370-room Hotel Palais d'Orsay.

By 1939 the station's short platforms had become unsuitable for the longer trains that had come to be used for mainline services, and the Gare d'Orsay was closed to long-distance traffic, though some suburban trains of the SNCF continue to use its lower levels to this day. The Hotel Palais d'Orsay closed at the beginning of 1973.

The former station was used as a collection point for the dispatch of parcels to prisoners of war during the Second World War, and after the war as a reception centre for liberated prisoners on their return; a plaque on the side of the building facing the River Seine commemorates this latter use.

The structure served as the setting for several films, including Orson Welles's version of Franz Kafka's The Trial, and is a central location in Bernardo Bertolucci's The Conformist. General Charles de Gaulle held a press conference in the ballroom of the Hotel Palais d'Orsay on 19 May 1958 at which he announced his "availability to serve his country", ushering in the end of the French Fourth Republic.

As well, it was the inspiration for the larger Penn Station in New York City when Alexander Cassatt, president of the Pennsylvania Railroad, traveled on his annual trip to Europe in 1901.

Museum

In 1977, the French Government decided to convert the station to a museum. The building was listed as a historical monument in 1978 and reopened as the Musée d'Orsay in December 1986. The chief architect for the conversion was the Italian Gae Aulenti.  There is a huge clock which still works in the main terminal housing the museum.

References

External links

 Satellite image from Google Maps

Railway termini in Paris
Defunct railway stations in Paris
History of Paris
Hotel buildings completed in 1900
Railway stations in France opened in 1900
Railway hotels
Beaux-Arts architecture in France
Historicist architecture in France
Buildings and structures in the 7th arrondissement of Paris